Du Tao (died 16 September 315?), courtesy name Jingwen, was a Chinese rebel leader during the Jin dynasty (266–420). In 311, he was proclaimed a leader of an uprising led by Ba and Shu refugees in Jingzhou and Xiangzhou (湘州; in modern Hunan), who were oppressed by the local administrators and populace. Du Tao fought with the Jin forces led by Wang Dun, Tao Kan and Zhou Fang for roughly four years, before he presumably died while fleeing in 315, putting an end to his rebellion.

Life

Brief stint under Luo Shang 
Du Tao was from Chengdu, Yizhou (in present-day Sichuan) and was the grandson of a famous official in Shu Han named Du Zhi (杜植) during the Three Kingdoms period. In 300, the official Luo Shang was made Inspector of Yizhou. It was during this time that Du Tao was likely chosen by Luo Shang to be an Abundant Talent candidate.  

In Yizhou, Luo Shang had an unsteady relationship with a powerful refugee leader named Li Te. Luo Shang was ordered by the court to send the refugees back to Qinzhou and Yongzhou, while Li Te, at the behest of the refugees, wanted to lengthen their stay until it was completely safe for them to return. Luo Shang tolerated them at first, but was later determined to carry out his duty. Li Te's envoy, Yan Shi (閻式), managed to persuade Du Tao into helping the refugees by talking his superior into extending their stay. In fact, Du Tao was inclined to give the refugees a year-long extension instead of Yan Shi's initial proposal of extending to winter. However, Luo Shang refused to listen to Du Tao, so in protest, Du Tao returned his Abundant Talent slate and went back home.

Refugee crisis in Jingzhou and Xiangzhou 
In 311, Du Tao was forced to migrate to Nanping commandery (南平郡, in present-day Gong'an County, Hubei) due to a recent uprising by a Shu native named Li Xiang (李驤, not to be confused with the Cheng Han general of the same name, Li Xiang). The Administrator of Nanping, Ying Zhan (應詹), had known of Du Tao's talents. Because of this, Ying Zhan welcomed him and appointed him the Prefect of Liling. After Li Xiang occupied Lexiang (樂鄉; northeast of present-day Songzi, Hubei), Du Tao and Ying Zhan attacked and routed him. Later, Li Xiang offered his surrender to the Inspector of Jingzhou, Wang Cheng. Wang Cheng tricked Li Xiang by pretending to accept his surrender before killing him and drowning 8,000 of his followers in the Yangtze.

Resentment grew among the Ba and Shu refugees, who were fleeing their homelands west to avoid the rise of Cheng Han in Yizhou. They were treated poorly by the local administrators and populace, and the recent actions by Wang Cheng only disturbed them more. Not long after, another native of Shu named Du Chou (杜疇) rebelled. The recent uprisings by Shu refugees were beginning to arouse suspicion among officials in Jingzhou and Xiangzhou. In the end, the Inspector of Xiangzhou, Xun Tiao (荀眺), planned to carry out a mass execution on the refugees. However, his plans leaked out to the public, which caused the refugees to revolt en masse in Jingzhou and Xiangzhou. Because Du Tao was from Shu and a popular figure, the rebels proclaimed him as their leader.

First rebellion 
Du Tao agreed to lead the rebellion, declaring himself the Governor of Liangzhou and Yizhou. He occupied the city of Changsha where Xun Tiao resided, forcing him to retreat to Guangzhou. The Inspector of Guangzhou, Guo Ne (郭訥), and Wang Cheng sent their generals to quell the rebellion, but Du Tao routed them. Du Tao allowed his men to plunder and pillage, and for a brief while, he surrendered to the Jin general, Shan Jian (山簡) before resuming his revolt. Du Tao killed the newly appointed Inspector of Jingzhou, Guo Cha (郭察), and continued his successes by conquering Lingling, Guiyang and Wuchang while killing many officials along the way.

The following year, Wang Cheng was dismissed by Sima Rui as Inspector of Jingzhou in favor of Zhou Yi due to as Wang was displayed inefficient leadership and was constantly defeated by Du Tao. Just as Zhou Yi arrived at his base, a refugee from Jianping (建平, in present-day Jingzhou), Fu Mi (傅密) as well as others rose up in support of Du Tao. Du Tao sent his subordinate Wang Zhen (王眞) to help the rebels by attacking Mianyang, enveloping Zhou Yi from two sides. With Jin at the brink of losing Jingzhou, the Jin commander, Wang Dun, immediately sent Tao Kan, Zhou Fang and Gan Zhuo to support Zhou Yi.

In 313, Tao Kan saved Zhou Yi at Xunshui by forcing Du Tao to retreat to Lingkou after Tao sent Zhu Ci to reinforce Zhou. He later predicted that Du Tao would go to Wuchang next, so Tao Kan took many shortcuts to get to the commandery as quick as possible. Du Tao had indeed been planning to go to Wuchang, but as Tao Kan had arrived first, he was defeated by a counterattack which caused him to retreat back to Changsha. Later that year, Du Tao faced Tao Kan and Zhou Fang again, but was once more defeated.

Brief surrender 
By 315, Du Tao's forces were beginning to collapse. Continuous defeats against the Jin forces were diminishing his numbers, causing him to ask Sima Rui for surrender. When Sima Rui rejected it, he then wrote a lengthy letter to Ying Zhan, justifying his rebellion by stating the oppression faced by his followers under the Jin regime. Ying Zhan sympathized with him, so he sent the letter to Sima Rui along with his own testimony as to why Du should be pardoned. Sima Rui was impressed by Du's reasonings and sent an official named Wang Yun (王運) to accept his surrender. 

Along the way, Du Tao was also appointed as Chief of military affairs in Badong commandery (巴東郡; around present-day Chongqing). However, although Du Tao's surrender was acknowledged by Sima Rui, the Jin generals were eager to claim credit for putting down the rebellion, so they continued relentlessly harassing Du Tao's forces. Du was angered by this and felt that his deal had not been honoured. Therefore, when Wang Yun arrived, Du Tao had him killed and resumed his rebellion.

Second rebellion and fate 
Du Tao sent his general Zhang Yan (張彥) to raid Yuzhang commandery (豫章, present-day Nanchang, Jiangxi). Zhang Yan burned many of the cities and towns in the commandery, but he was later defeated and killed by Zhou Fang's forces. Later, Zhou Fang attempted to attack Xiangcheng with a navy, but at the same time, Du Tao had sent his general Du Hong (杜弘) to attack Penkou (湓口, in present-day Jiujiang, Jiangxi). Zhou Fang turned back to face Du Hong, who he had a back and forth battle with, but was eventually successful in turning him away. 

Later that year, Du Tao was locked with Tao Kan in a stalemate. In his final battle, Du sent his general Wang Gong (王貢) to lead against Tao Kan. However, Tao managed to convince Wang to defect to his side, which created confusion in Du Tao's army and caused them to scatter. Du Tao also retreated, but what became of him after this was unknown. Three different accounts stated that he either was killed, successfully escaped and disappeared or drowned himself in a river. Regardless, the rebellion ended in 315 after Tao Kan recovered Changsha. Du Tao's followers were granted amnesty by Sima Rui after they surrendered.

References 

 Fang, Xuanling (ed.) (648). Book of Jin (Jin Shu).
 Sima, Guang (1084). Zizhi Tongjian.

315 deaths
Jin dynasty (266–420) generals
Jin dynasty (266–420) rebels
Jin dynasty (266–420) people killed in action